Impressive Rome is an album by American jazz saxophonist Lee Konitz and French pianist Martial Solal recorded in Italy in 1968 and released on the Campi label.

Critical reception

Ken Dryden of Allmusic commented: "Lee Konitz's initial recording session with pianist Martial Solal produced two albums (the other one is European Episode), including alternate versions of several songs ... This was a great beginning to an occasional partnership that lasted into the early '80s and produced several more albums".

Track listing 
 "Anthropology" [Version 2] (Charlie Parker, Dizzy Gillespie) - 6:55 	
 "Impressive Rome" (Johnny Dinamo) - 5:23
 "Lover Man" [Version 1] (Jimmy Davis, Ram Ramirez, Jimmy Sherman) - 6:15
 "Stella by Starlight" (Victor Young, Ned Washington) - 6:55
 "Roman Blues" [Version 2] (Dinamo) - 9:10

Personnel 
Lee Konitz – alto saxophone
Martial Solal – piano
Henri Texier – bass 
Daniel Humair – drums

References 

Lee Konitz albums
Martial Solal albums
1968 albums